"Alive and Kicking" is a song released by the Scottish rock band Simple Minds as the lead single from their seventh album, Once Upon a Time. The song reached number three on the US Billboard Hot 100 and number four in Canada; it peaked within the top five of several European countries including Italy, where the song reached number one.

Chart performance
Following on from the success of previous non-album single, "Don't You (Forget About Me)", "Alive and Kicking" was released as a single, reaching number 3 on the US Billboard Hot 100 and number one on the Top Rock Tracks chart (now called the Mainstream Rock chart). The song also reached number 4 in Canada. In Europe, the song topped the charts in Italy for one week, reached number 2 in Belgium, Ireland, and the Netherlands, and peaked at number 7 on the UK Singles Chart. In 1992, when re-released as a double A-side with "Love Song" to promote the band's compilation album Glittering Prize 81/92, it managed to reach a new peak of number 6. Elsewhere, "Alive and Kicking" reached number 5 in New Zealand, number 16 in South Africa, and just missed the top 20 in Australia, peaking at number 21.

Music video
The music video for "Alive and Kicking" was filmed near the town of Hunter, at North–South Lake in the Catskill Mountains of New York State. A portion of the video was filmed on the overlook at the site of the old Catskill Mountain House (previously demolished). It was directed by Zbigniew Rybczyński, who directed the video for "All the Things She Said", the third single from the same album.

Track listings
7-inch single
 "Alive and Kicking" (Single Version) (4:47)
 "Alive and Kicking" (Instrumental Version) (6:01)

12-inch single
 "Alive and Kicking" (5:26)
 "Alive and Kicking" (Instrumental Version) (6:01)

Second 12-inch single
 Ltd Edition Reflective Gold Sleeve
 "Alive and Kicking" (5:26)
 "Alive and Kicking" (Instrumental Version) (6:01)
 "Up on the Catwalk" (Live) (5:37)

Personnel
 Produced by Jimmy Iovine and Bob Clearmountain
 Engineered by Moira Marquis and Mark McKenna
 Engineering assisted by Martin White
 Words and music by Simple Minds (Kerr, Burchill, MacNeil)
 "Up on the Catwalk" recorded live at Barrowlands, Glasgow, 5 January 1985
 Backing vocals by Robin Clark

Charts and certifications

Weekly charts
"Alive and Kicking"

"Love Song" / "Alive and Kicking"

Year-end charts

Certifications

Appearances in media
In 1992, "Alive & Kicking" provided the soundtrack for a famous promo, entitled "A whole new ball game" for BSkyB's launch of the FA Premier League.

East Side Beat version

In 1992, Italian dance music group East Side Beat covered "Alive and Kicking". There are five remixes in total. Two versions are found on the 7-inch single and an additional three are on the CD single.

Charts

References

1985 songs
1985 singles
1992 singles
Simple Minds songs
Number-one singles in Italy
Songs written by Jim Kerr
Music videos directed by Zbigniew Rybczyński
Virgin Records singles
FFRR Records singles
Song recordings produced by Bob Clearmountain
Song recordings produced by Jimmy Iovine
Songs written by Charlie Burchill
Songs written by Mick MacNeil